Conilithes is an extinct genus  of sea snails, marine gastropod mollusks in the family Conidae, the cone snails.

This genus is known in the fossil record from the Lutetian (Eocene) of France, the United Kingdom and New Zealand to the Piacenzian (Pliocene) of Italy (age range: 48.6 to 2.588 million years ago).

Conolithus (Hermannsen, 1846) is an "invalid emendation" of Conilithes (Swainson, 1840), in the terminology introduced in the Copenhagen Decisions on Zoological Nomenclature (London, 1953: 43). Conilithes Swainson (spelled Conolithes by Wenz) is a junior homonym of Conilites (Schloth, 1820) (spelled Conolites by Wenz)

Species
 † Conilithes allioni  (Michelotti, 1847)
 † Conilithes antidiluvianus  (Bruguiére, 1792)
 † Conilithes aquitanicus  (Mayer, 1858)
 † Conilithes asyli (De Gregorio, 1880)
 † Conilithes brezinae (Hoernes & Auinger, 1879)
 † Conilithes brockenensis (Vella, 1954)
† Conilithes brocchii (Bronn, 1828)
 † Conilithes canaliculatus (Brocchi, 1814)
 - Conilithes desidiosus (Adams, 1854)
 † Conilithes dujardini (Deshayes, 1845)
 † Conilithes dujardini egerensis (Noszky, 1937)
 † Conilithes dujardini sallomacensis (Peyrot, 1930)
 † Conilithes eichwaldi  (Harzhauser & Landau, 2016)
 † Conilithes exaltatus (Eichwald, 1830)
 † Conilithes fracta (Finlay, 1924)
 † Conilithes lyratus  (P. Marshall, 1918) 
 † Conilithes oliveri (Marwick, 1931)
 † Conilithes parisiensis  (Deshayes, 1865) 
 † Conilithes pendulus pusillanimis (De Gregorio, 1880)
 † Conilithes rivertonensis (Finlay, 1926)
 † Conilithes sceptophorus (Boettger, 1887)
 † Conilithes suteri (Cossmann, 1918)
 † Conilithes tahuensis (R. S. Allan, 1926)
 † Conilithes wollastoni (Maxwell, 1978)

Notes
The specimen indicated as Conus deperditus by Suter in 1917 was referred to as Conospira suteri by Cossmann in 1918 and as Conospira fracta by Finlay in 1924.

References

 C.A. Fleming Conilithes Swainson Replaces Conospirus De Gregorio New Zealand Journal of Geology and Geophysics - Volume 11, Issue 1, 1968
Global Biodiversity Information Facility: Conilithes
 Maxwell, P.A. (2009). Cenozoic Mollusca. pp 232–254 in Gordon, D.P. (ed.) New Zealand inventory of biodiversity. Volume one. Kingdom Animalia: Radiata, Lophotrochozoa, Deuterostomia. Canterbury University Press, Christchurch

Conidae